United Nations Security Council resolution 654, adopted unanimously on 4 May 1990, after recalling resolutions 637 (1989), 644 (1989), 650 (1990) and 653 (1990), the council endorsed a report by the Secretary-General and decided to extend the mandate of the United Nations Observer Group in Central America for a further six months until 7 November 1990.

The decision to extend the mandate was taken on the council's understanding that the demobilisation process of the Contras and other resistance in Nicaragua would be complete by 10 June 1990. The resolution also noted the need to remain vigilant of the financial costs of the Observer Group, given the increased demand on United Nations peacekeeping forces.

The Council went on to welcome the efforts of the Secretary-General to find a solution to the conflict in El Salvador concerning the Government of El Salvador and the Farabundo Martí National Liberation Front, and requested him to report back by 10 June 1990 concerning the completion of the demobilisation process.

See also
 History of Central America
 History of El Salvador
 History of Nicaragua
 List of United Nations Security Council Resolutions 601 to 700 (1987–1991)

References

External links
 
Text of the Resolution at undocs.org

 0654
History of Central America
Politics of Central America
 0654
 0654
May 1990 events
1990 in Central America